Sir Edward Owen Cox  (21 January 1866 – 30 July 1932), known as Owen Cox, was a Welsh-born  Australian businessman and politician.

Cox was born in South Wales, was educated at Christ's Hospital, and went to sea at the age of fourteen. He left his first ship at Auckland, New Zealand, however, and went into the banking business. After a few years he returned to Britain, but then sailed to Australia and settled in Sydney. He became chairman of Birt & Co and a director of the Federal Steam Navigation Co Ltd. He was appointed to the New South Wales Legislative Council in 1922.

For his war services, Cox was appointed Knight Commander of the Order of the British Empire (KBE) in  the 1918 New Year Honours and promoted to Knight Grand Cross (GBE) in the Dominion war honours of 1920.

Cox died in Monte Carlo, aged 66, after an illness lasting several months.

References

 Obituary, The Times, 1 August 1932

1866 births
1932 deaths
People educated at Christ's Hospital
Welsh emigrants to Australia
Members of the New South Wales Legislative Council
Australian Knights Grand Cross of the Order of the British Empire
Australian politicians awarded knighthoods
Australian businesspeople in shipping
Welsh expatriates in Monaco